The Mundurukú languages of Brazil form a branch of the Tupian language family.  They are Munduruku and the extinct Kuruáya.

Varieties
Loukotka (1968) lists the following names for Mundurucú language varieties, including names of unattested varieties.

Mundurucú / Paiquizé / Pari / Weidéñe - originally spoken along the Tapajós River, now on the Urariá River and Maué-assú River, Amazonas.
Kuruáya / Caravare / Curivere / Guahuara / Curuapa - spoken on the Curua River, now perhaps extinct.

Proto-language
Some Proto-Mundurukú reconstructions by Picanço (2005) are as follows.

{| class="wikitable sortable"
! English gloss !! Proto-Mundurukú
|-
| wild cat || **sipɔrɔ
|-
| macaw, sp. || **sipaLa
|-
| It burned. || **o-si-pik
|-
| bird || **oasɨ̃
|-
| manioc || **masɨk
|-
| babaçu || **kosɨ
|-
| fish, sp. || **isɨe
|-
| snake || **pɨy
|-
| leaf || **tɨp / **Lɨp
|-
| sling || **tobɨy / **Lobɨy
|-
| my cultivated garden || **o-kɨʔ
|-
| an old lady || **abɨt
|-
| the day after tomorrow || **kɨyaCe
|-
| to go || **Cɨ / **Dɨ
|-
| my name || **o-bɨtet
|-
| It's cold. || **i-Cɨk
|-
| Who? || **abɨ
|-
| my finger/hand || **o-bɨʔ
|-
| It's smoked. || **i-pɨrɨk
|-
| piquia tree || **ʃaʔip
|-
| fire/firewood || **Laʃa
|-
| I slept. || **oʃet
|-
| ant, sp. || **wiʃaʔ
|-
| fish, sp. || **Laʃew/oy
|-
| chief || **toʃaw
|-
| louse || **kip
|-
| child || **bɨkit
|-
| mosquito || **tʃik
|-
| be hot || **takjVp
|}

References

Tupian languages